Melgar Province is a province of the Puno Region in Peru. The capital of the province is the city of Ayaviri.

Geography 
The Willkanuta range and the La Raya range traverse the province. Some of the highest mountains of the province are listed below:

Political division 
The province measures  and is divided into nine districts:

Ethnic groups 
The people in the province are mainly indigenous citizens of Quechua descent. Quechua is the language which the majority of the population (70.54%) learnt to speak in childhood, 29.09% of the residents started speaking using the Spanish language and  0.23% using Aymara  (2007 Peru Census).

See also 
 Hatun Mayu
 Janq'uquta
 Mawk'allaqta
 Suyt'uqucha

References

External links 
  Official website

Melgar